The High Windows (Hebrew: החלונות הגבוהים, HaKhalonot HaGvohim) is the debut and only studio album by the Israeli pop group The High Windows. Released in 1967, a few of its tracks  became milestones of the Israeli pop music. The song Zemer Nuge was written by Rachel Bluwstein. In 2007, forty years after its original release date, a remastered edition was released and went platinum in Israel.

Personnel
Band members:
 Arik Einstein - Vocals
 Shmulik Kraus - Guitars, Vocals, Composing
 Josey Katz - Vocals
Other musicians involved in the recording were:
 Zigi Skarbnik - Piano, Pipe Organ, Vocals
 Shmuel Arokh - Bass Guitar
 Zohar Levi - Drums

Track listing
 "Yekhezqel" (יחזקאל, Ezekiel) – 3:14
 "Einech Yekhola" (אינך יכולה, You Can't) – 2:41
 "Chayal Shel Shoqolad" (חייל של שוקולד, Chocolate Soldier) – 2:58
 "Ahava Rishona" (אהבה ראשונה, First Love) – 2:47
 "Eyfo Hem Kol Avoteynu" (איפה הם כל אבותינו, Where Are All of our Ancestors) – 3:23
 "Kol HaShavu'a Lach" (כל השבוע לך, The Whole Week for You) – 3:02
 "Zemer Noogeh" (זמר נוגה, Doleful Singing) – 2:33
 "Boobah Zehava" (בובה זהבה, Zehava Doll) – 3:19
 "Az Ma" (אז מה, So What) – 3:26
 "Horosqop" (הורוסקופ, Horoscope) – 2:51
 "Yalda Qt'ana" (ילדה קטנה, Little Girl) – 3:18

1967 albums
Hebrew-language albums
The High Windows albums
Hed Arzi Music albums